Allah Darreh-ye Sofla (also Romanized as Allāh Darreh-ye Soflá and Āleh Darreh-ye Soflá; also known as Āleh Derreh-ye Pā’īn, Allāh Darreh, Allāh Darreh-ye Pā’īn, Halagara Pain, Hald-i-Rāh, and Hāleh Darreh-ye Pā’īn) is a village in Kowleh Rural District, Saral District, Divandarreh County, Kurdistan Province, Iran. At the 2006 census, its population was 464, in 93 families. The village is populated by Kurds.

References 

Towns and villages in Divandarreh County
Kurdish settlements in Kurdistan Province